The shooting competitions at the 1992 Summer Olympics took place at a shooting range complex in Mollet del Vallès outside Barcelona, Spain. Competitions were held in a total of thirteen events — seven men's events, four women's events, and two events open to both genders. It was the first time a woman (Zhang Shan in the skeet competition) took a gold medal in such an open event, and also the last time they were held.

It was also the first games for 10 metre running target, which replaced 50 metre running target on the Olympic program, as well as the first games with the new targets in all rifle and pistol events except 50 metre pistol, leading to numerous automatic Olympic records.

The shooting events at the 1992 Olympics mark the first time that Independent Olympic Participants (from Yugoslavia after their country was suspended), competing under the Olympic flag, have won medals in any sport at any Olympic competition.

Medal summary

Medal table

Men's events

Women's events

Open events

Participating nations
A total of 407 shooters, 290 men and 117 women, from 83 nations competed at the Barcelona Games:

References

External links

 
1992 Summer Olympics events
1992
Olympics
Shooting competitions in Spain